Alexandr Vyacheslavovich Mukanin (born 24 August 1978) is a Tajikistani professional footballer who also holds Russian citizenship.

Career
Mukanin made his professional debut in the Tajikistan Higher League in 1999 for Varzob Dushanbe.

Career statistics

International

Statistics accurate as of 22 October 2015

Honours
Varzob Dushanbe
Tajikistan Higher League (2): 1999, 2000,
Tajikistan Cup (1): 1999
Regar-TadAZ
Tajikistan Higher League (1): 2006
Tajikistan Cup (2): 2005, 2006
AFC President's Cup (1): 2005
Tajikistan
AFC Challenge Cup (1): 2006

References

External links
 

Tajikistani footballers
Tajikistani expatriate footballers
Tajikistan international footballers
FC Zhemchuzhina Sochi players
1978 births
Living people
Footballers at the 2006 Asian Games
Association football goalkeepers
Asian Games competitors for Tajikistan